Casimir "Cajou" Zuraszek (birth name Kazimierz Juraszek; born 26 February 1949) is a French former professional footballer who played as a forward.

After football 
After his retirement from football, Zuraszek became responsible for financial affairs in the communal center of social action in the city of Cholet. He also worked as an educator in several amateur football clubs from 1982 to 2017. At the age of 68, Zuraszek was a coach at a "small" amateur club.

Honours 
Lens

 Division 2: 1972–73
 Coupe de France runner-up: 1974–75

Notes

References 

1949 births
Living people
Sportspeople from Pas-de-Calais
French footballers
French people of Polish descent
Association football forwards
RC Lens players
SC Hazebrouck players
Olympique Thonon Chablais players
SO Cholet players
Ligue 1 players
Ligue 2 players
Championnat de France Amateur (1935–1971) players
French Division 3 (1971–1993) players
French Division 4 (1978–1993) players
Footballers from Hauts-de-France